José Manuel Miranda Boudy (born August 22, 1986 in Varadero, Matanzas Province) is a Cuban footballer who last played for Golden State Force in the Premier Development League.

Career

Club
Miranda began his career in his native Cuba, playing for his local side, Matanzas.

Following his defection to the United States, Miranda signed on with Puerto Rican team Sevilla FC Puerto Rico, before eventually finding his way to southern California. He played for Los Angeles-based amateur team, before signing with the expansion Hollywood United Hitmen in the USL Premier Development League for the 2009 PDL season.

International
He made his senior international debut for Cuba in a February 2008 friendly match against Guyana and has earned a total of 2 caps, scoring no goals.

Miranda was called up to the Cuba national football team to compete in the qualifying tournament for the 2008 Summer Olympics. He started in the games against Trinidad and Tobago and Grenada, but following Cuba's game against the United States in Tampa, Florida, on March 11, 2008, Miranda defected under the US's wet foot dry foot policy along with six of his teammates.

References

External links
 

1986 births
Living people
People from Varadero
Defecting Cuban footballers
Association football goalkeepers
Cuban footballers
Cuba international footballers
FC Matanzas players
Sevilla FC Puerto Rico players
Hollywood United Hitmen players
Puerto Rico United players
LA Laguna FC players
Orange County SC players
Cuban expatriate footballers
Expatriate footballers in Puerto Rico
Expatriate soccer players in the United States
Cuban expatriate sportspeople in Puerto Rico
Cuban expatriate sportspeople in the United States
USL League Two players
USL Championship players